The list of Apple codenames covers the codenames given to products by Apple Inc. during development. The codenames are often used internally only, normally to maintain the secrecy of the project. Occasionally a codename may become the released product's name. Most of Apple's codenames from the 1980s and 1990s are provided by the book Apple Confidential 2.0.

Accessories
 AirTags, a Tile-like personal item tracking hardware & app –  AirTags, Apple Tags, B389, Durian
 AirPods (1st Generation) – B188
 AirPods (2nd Generation) – B288
AirPods Pro – B298
 AirPods Max – B515
 AirPort Express 802.11n (5th Generation) – K31
 Apple IIe Card for the Macintosh LC – Double Exposure
 A rumored augmented reality and virtual reality device – T288
 Apple II 3.5" Disk Controller Card – NuMustang
 Apple Color OneScanner 600/27 – Rio
 Apple Color OneScanner 1200/30 – New Orleans 
 Beats Flex – B372
 HomePod – B238
 HomePod mini – B520
 Built-in iSight (2005) –  M33
 External iSight (2003) – Q8
 Lightning Digital AV Adapter – Haywire
 Magic Trackpad 2 – D67
 MagSafe (iPhone) - B390
 Time Capsule – Wilma, M52

Apple TV
 Apple TV – iTV
 Apple TV (2nd generation) – K66
 Apple TV (3rd generation) – J33 
 Apple TV (4th generation) – J42
 Apple TV 4K – J105
 Apple TV 4K (2nd generation) – J305

Apple Watch
 Apple Watch – Gizmo,  N27 and N28

Apple-designed processors

The internal codenames for the CPU cores of Apple silicon A series and M series chips are named after islands, with the cores named after wind and weather patterns.

 Apple A6 and A6X – Bali, with Swift cores
 Apple A7 – Alcatraz, with Cyclone cores
 Apple A8 – Fiji, with Typhoon cores
 Apple A8X – Capri, with Typhoon cores
 Apple A9 – Maui (Samsung), Malta (TSMC), with Twister cores
 Apple A9X – Elba, with Twister cores
 Apple A10 Fusion – Cayman, with 2 Hurricane cores and 2 Zephyr cores
 Apple A10X Fusion – Myst, with 3 Hurricane cores and 3 Zephyr cores
 Apple A11 Bionic – Skye, with 2 Monsoon cores and 4 Mistral cores
 Apple A12 Bionic – Cyprus, with 2 Vortex cores and 4 Tempest cores
 Apple A12X and A12Z Bionic – Aruba, with 4 Vortex cores and 4 Tempest cores
 Apple A13 Bionic – Cebu, with 2 Lightning and 4 Thunder cores
 Apple A14 Bionic – Sicily, with 2 Firestorm cores and 4 Icestorm cores
Apple A15 Bionic – Ellis, with 2 Avalanche cores and 4 Blizzard cores
Apple A16 Bionic – Crete, with 2 Everest cores and 4 Sawtooth cores
 Apple A17 Bionic - Coll

 Apple M1 –  Tonga
 Apple M1 cores - Icestorm efficiency cores and Firestorm performance cores, with Lifuka GPU cores
Apple M1 Pro – Jade-Chop
Apple M1 Max – Jade-C
 Apple M1 Ultra – Jade-2C
 Apple M2 – Staten
 Apple M2 cores - Blizzard efficiency cores and Avalanche performance cores
 Apple M2 Pro – Rhodes Chop
 Apple M2 Max – Rhodes 1C
 Apple M2 Ultra – Rhodes 2C
 Apple M3 – Ibiza

Computers

Apple
 Apple IIGS – Cortland 
 Apple II ROM 3 – Tenspeed

In chronological order:

Macintosh
The first Macintosh was released in 1984:
 Macintosh 128K - Macintosh
 Macintosh 512k, 512ke - Fat Mac
 Macintosh XL - Lisa
 Macintosh Plus - Mr. T
 Macintosh SE simulation - Aladdin
 Macintosh SE FDHD - Aladdin
 Macintosh SE FDHD - Chablis
 Macintosh SE/30 - Fafnir
 Macintosh SE - Freeport
 Macintosh SE FDHD - Freeport
 Macintosh SE/30 - Green Jade
 Macintosh SE - Maui
 Macintosh SE FDHD - Maui
 Macintosh SE - PlusPlus
 Macintosh SE FDHD - PlusPlus
 Macintosh II - Becks
 Macintosh II - Cabernet
 Macintosh II - Ikki
 Macintosh II - Little Big Mac
 Macintosh II - Milwaukee
 Macintosh II - Paris
 Macintosh II - Reno
 Macintosh II - Uzi
 Macintosh IIcx - Atlantic
 Macintosh IIcx - Aurora
 Macintosh IIcx - Cobra
 Macintosh IIci - Aurora II
 Macintosh IIci - Cobra II
 Macintosh IIci - Pacific
 Macintosh IIci - Stingray
 Macintosh IIfx - Weed Whacker
 Macintosh IIfx - Zone 5
 Macintosh IIfx - Blackbird
 Macintosh IIfx - Four Square
 Macintosh IIfx - F-16
 Macintosh IIfx - F-19
 Macintosh IIfx - IIxi
 Macintosh IIfx - Stealth
 Macintosh IIsi - Erickson
 Macintosh IIsi - Oceanic
 Macintosh IIsi - Raffica
 Macintosh IIsi - Ray Ban
 Macintosh IIvi - Brazil 32c
 Macintosh IIvx - Brazil 16c
 Macintosh IIx - Spock
 Macintosh IIx - Stratos
 Macintosh Portable - Espirit
 Macintosh Portable - Laguna
 Macintosh Portable - Malibu
 Macintosh LC - Elsie
 Macintosh LC - Pinball
 Macintosh LC - Prism
 Macintosh LC 580 - Dragonkok
 Macintosh LC III - Elsie III
 Macintosh LC II - Foster Farms
 Macintosh LC 520 - Hook
 Macintosh LC 550 - Hook 33
 Macintosh LC 575 - Optimus
 Macintosh LC III - Vail
 Macintosh Classic II - Apollo
 Macintosh Classic - Civic
 Macintosh Classic II - Montana
 Macintosh Color Classic - Slice
 Macintosh Classic - XO
 Macintosh Quadra 605 - Aladdin
 Macintosh Quadra 605 - Primus
 Macintosh Quadra 610 - Speedbump 610
 Macintosh Quadra 630 - Crusader
 Macintosh Quadra 630 - Show Biz
 Macintosh Quadra 630 - Show & Tell
 Macintosh Quadra 650 - Speedbump 650
 Macintosh Quadra 660AV - Tempest
 Macintosh Quadra 700 - Evo 200
 Macintosh Quadra 700 - IIce
 Macintosh Quadra 700 - Shadow
 Macintosh Quadra 700 - Spike
 Macintosh Quadra 800 - Fridge
 Macintosh Quadra 800 - Wombat 33
 Macintosh Quadra 840AV - Typhoon
 Macintosh Quadra 840AV - Quadra 1000
 Macintosh Quadra 840AV - Cyclone
 Macintosh Quadra 900 - Darwin
 Macintosh Quadra 900 - Eclipse
 Macintosh Quadra 900 - IIex
 Macintosh Quadra 900 - Premise 500
 Macintosh Quadra 950 - Amazon
 Macintosh Quadra 950 - Zydeco
 Macintosh TV - LD50, Peter Pan
 Twentieth Anniversary Macintosh - Pomona
 Twentieth Anniversary Macintosh - Smoke and Mirrors
 Twentieth Anniversary Macintosh - Spartacus

eMac
The first eMac was released in 2002
 eMac (ATI Graphics) - Northern Lights
 eMac - P69
 eMac (2005) - Q86J

iBook
The first iBook was released in 1999.
 iBook (FireWire) - P1.5
 iBook (32 MB VRAM) - P72B
 iBook (800/900 MHz 32 MB VRAM) - P73D
 iBook - Bismol
 iBook - Lanai
 iBook G3 (Dual USB) - Marble
 iBook - P1
 iBook (14.1 LCD) - Son of Pismo
 iBook (Dual USB) - P29
 iBook (14.1 LCD) - P54
 iBook (Opaque 16 MB VRAM) - P72B
 iBook (late 2001) - P92
 iBook G4 (early 2004) - Q72
 iBook G4 (mid-2005) - Q72B
 iBook G4 (early 2004) - Q73
 iBook G4 (mid-2005) - Q73B

iMac
The first iMac was released in 1998.
 iMac G3 (Bondi Blue) - Mac Man and Columbus
 iMac G3 (Bondi Blue) - C1
 iMac G3 (Bondi Blue) - Elroy
 iMac G3 (Bondi Blue) - Tailgate
 iMac G3 (5 Flavors) - Life Savers
 iMac G3, iMac DV, iMac DV+, iMac DV SE - Kihei, P7
 iMac G3 (summer 2001) - Kiva
 iMac G4 (USB 2.0; 15-inch & 17-inch) - Horizon, Q26B, Q26C
 iMac G4 (17-inch Flat Panel) - P79
 iMac G4 (flat panel) - Tessera, P80
 iMac G5 (17-inch, 20-inch) - Hero
 iMac G5 (20-inch) - Fino, M23
 iMac G5 (Ambient Light Sensor) 17-inch Q45C
 iMac G5 (Ambient Light Sensor) 20-inch Q45D
 iMac G5 iSight (17-, 20-inch) - Q87
 iMac (21.5-inch, Late 2012) J30
 iMac (27-inch, Late 2012) J31

Mac mini
The first Mac mini was in 2005.
 Mac Mini (early 2006) - Kaleidoscope
 Mac mini - Twiggy, Q88

Mac Pro
 Mac Pro (Round) J90
 Mac Pro (Mid-2012) & Mac Pro Server (Mid-2012) K5B

MacBook
 MacBook (12-inch) - Stealth
 MacBook (Early-2006) - M42

MacBook Air
 MacBook Air (11-inch, Mid-2012) J11
 MacBook Air (13-inch, Mid-2012) J13
 MacBook Air (11-inch, Mid-2013) - J41

MacBook Pro
 MacBook Pro 13" - J52
 MacBook Pro 13" - J130
 MacBook Pro (13-inch, Early 2011) - K90I
 MacBook Pro (15-inch, Early 2011) - K91
 MacBook Pro (17-inch, Early 2011) - K92
 MacBook Pro (13-inch, Late 2011) - K90IA
 MacBook Pro (15-inch, Late 2011) - K91A
 MacBook Pro (17-inch, Late 2011) - K92A
 13-inch MacBook Pro with Retina Display- D1
 15-inch MacBook Pro with Retina Display - D2
 MacBook Pro (Retina, 13-inch, Early 2013) - J44
 MacBook Pro (Retina, 15-inch, Early 2013) - J45
 MacBook Pro (Retina, 15-inch, Mid 2015) - J53

PowerBook
 PowerBook 100 - Asahi
 PowerBook 100 - Derringer
 PowerBook 100 - Rosebud
 PowerBook 145 - Colt 45
 PowerBook 145B - Colt 45
 PowerBook 140 - Tim Lite
 PowerBook 170 - Tim
 PowerBook 170 - Road Warrior
 PowerBook 160 - Brooks
 PowerBook 165 - Dart LC
 PowerBook 180 - Converse
 PowerBook 180 - Dartanian
 PowerBook 165c - Monet
 PowerBook 180c - Hokusai
 PowerBook 150 - Jedi
 PowerBook 190 - Omega
 PowerBook 190cs - Omega
 PowerBook 540, 540c, 550c, 500 with PowerPC - Blackbird
 PowerBook 520, 520c, 550c, 500 with PowerPC- Blackbird LC
 PowerBook 540/540c - Spruce Goose
 PowerBook 540, 540c, 550c, 500 with PowerPC - SR-71
 PowerBook 1400c, 1400cs - Epic
 PowerBook 2400c - Comet
 PowerBook 2400c - Mighty Cat
 PowerBook 2400c - Nautilus
 PowerBook 3400c Hooper
 PowerBook 5300 Series Mustang
 PowerBook 5300 - M2
 PowerBook Duo 210, 230- BOB W (Best of Both Worlds)
 PowerBook Duo 210, 230 - Cinnamon
 PowerBook Duo 210, 230 - DBLite
 PowerBook Duo 250 - Ansel
 PowerBook Duo 270c - Escher
 PowerBook Duo 280/280c - Yeager
 PowerBook Duo 2300c/100 - AJ
 PowerBook Duo Dock/Plus/II - Gemini
 PowerBook G3 - PowerBook 3500
 PowerBook G3 - Kanga
 PowerBook (FireWire) - Pismo
 PowerBook G3 - Wallstreet
 PowerBook G3 (September 1998) - PDQ
 PowerBook G3 (Bronze Keyboard) - 101
 PowerBook G3 (Bronze Keyboard) - Lombard
 PowerBook G3 (FireWire) - 102
 PowerBook G3 (FireWire) - P8
 PowerBook G4 (17-inch) - Hammerhead
 PowerBook G4 - Mercury
 PowerBook G4 - 103
 PowerBook G4 (DVI)  - Ivory
 PowerBook G4 (Gigabit Ethernet) - Onyx
 PowerBook G4 (Gigabit Ethernet) - P25
 PowerBook G4 Titanium (1 GHz/867 MHz) - P88
 PowerBook G4 (12-inch) - P99
 PowerBook G4 (15-inch FW800) - Q16
 PowerBook G4 (15-inch 1.5/1.33GHz) - Q16A
 PowerBook G4 (17-inch 1.33GHz) - Q41
 PowerBook G4 (17-inch 1.5 GHz) - Q41A
 PowerBook G4 (12-inch DVI) - Q54
 PowerBook G4 (12-inch 1.33 GHz) - Q54A
 PowerBook G5 (EVT1) - Q51

PowerMac
 Power Macintosh 4400, 150 MHz Tanzania
 Power Macintosh 4400, 160 MHz Frosty
 Power Macintosh 4400, 200 Mhz Cupid
 Power Macintosh 5200/5300 LC - Bongo
 Power Macintosh 5200/5300 LC - Rebound
 Power Macintosh 5200/5300 LC - Trailblazer
 Power Macintosh 5200/5300 LC - Transformer
 Power Macintosh 5400 - Chimera
 Power Macintosh 5400 - Excalibur
 Power Macintosh 5500 - Phoenix
 Power Macintosh 6100 - Piltdown Man
 Power Macintosh 6200 - Crusader
 Power Macintosh 6300 - Elixir
 Power Macintosh 6400 - Hacksaw
 Power Macintosh 6400 - InstaTower
 Power Macintosh 6500 - Gazelle
 Power Macintosh 7100 - Carl Sagan
 Power Macintosh 7100 -  BHA (Butt-Head Astronomer)
 Power Macintosh 7100 - LAW (Lawyers Are Wimps)
 Power Macintosh 7200 - Catalyst
 Power Macintosh 7300 - Montana
 Power Macintosh 7500 - TNT
 Power Macintosh 7600 - Montana 7600
 Power Macintosh 8100 - Cold Fusion
 Power Macintosh 8100 - Flagship
 Power Macintosh 8500 - Nitro
 Power Macintosh 8600 - Kansas
 Power Macintosh 9600 - Kansas
 Power Macintosh 9500 - Autobahn
 Power Macintosh 9500 - Tsunami
 Power Mac 9700 Prototype PowerExpress
 Power Mac G3 All-in-One - Artemis
 Power Macintosh G3 Beige logic board Gossamer
 Power Macintosh G3 (Blue & White) enclosure - El Capitan
 Unreleased Hi-end Power Macintosh enclosure, prototype of El Capitan- Stumpy
 Power Macintosh G3 (Blue & White) - Silk
 Power Macintosh G3 (Blue & White) logic board; Yosemite 1.5 was the revision 2 board Yosemite
 Power Mac G4 (Digital Audio) - Clockwork
 Power Mac G4 (Digital Audio) - Tangent
 Power Mac G4 (Gigabit Ethernet) - Medusa2
 Power Mac G4 (Gigabit Ethernet) - Mystic
 Power Mac G4 (Gigabit Ethernet) - SnakeBite
 Power Mac G4 (Quicksilver) - Nichrome
 Power Mac G4 (Quicksilver) - Titan
 Power Mac G4 (AGP Graphics) - Sawtooth
 Power Mac G4 (AGP Graphics) - Project E
 Power Mac G4 (AGP Graphics) - P5
 Power Mac G4 (PCI Graphics) logic board - Yikes!
 Power Mac G4 (Mirrored Drive Doors) - P57
 Power Mac G4 (FW 800) - P58
 Power Mac G4 Cube - Rubicon
 Power Mac G4 Cube - Trinity
 Power Mac G4 Cube - P9
 Power Mac G5 - Q37
 Power Mac G5 - Omega
 Power Mac G5 (June 2004) - Q77, Q78
 Power Mac G5 (late 2005) - Cypher
 Unreleased Hi-end Power Macintosh project (1996) - Halo

iPad
 J1 – iPad (3rd generation) (Wi-Fi) 
 J2 – iPad (3rd generation) (Wi-Fi + Cellular)
 J72 – iPad Air 
 J82 – iPad Air 2
 J85 – iPad Mini with Retina display 
 J96 – iPad Mini 4 
 J98 and J99 – iPad Pro
 K48 – iPad (1st generation)
 K93 – iPad 2 (Wi-Fi)
 K94 – iPad 2 (Wi-Fi + GSM)
 K95 – iPad 2 (Wi-Fi + CDMA)
 P101 – iPad (fourth generation) (Wi-Fi)
 P103 – iPad (fourth generation) (Wi-Fi + Cellular International)
 P105 – iPad Mini (1st generation) (Wi-Fi)
 P107 – iPad Mini (1st generation) (Wi-Fi + Cellular International)

iPhone
iPhone (first generation) – M68 and Purple or Purple 2
iPhone 3G – N82 
iPhone 3GS – N88
iPhone 4 – N90
iPhone 4 (CDMA) – N92 
iPhone 4S – N94
iPhone 5 – N41 and N42 
iPhone 5C – N48
 Touch ID – Mesa
 iPhone 5S – N51 and N53 
iPhone 6 – N61
iPhone 6 Plus – N56
iPhone SE (1st generation) – N69
iPhone 6S – N71
iPhone 6S Plus – N66
iPhone 7 – D10
iPhone 7 Plus – D11
iPhone 8 – D20
iPhone 8 Plus – D21
Face ID – Pearl
iPhone X – D22 and Ferrari
iPhone XR – N84 and Star or Lisbon or Hangzhou
iPhone XS – D32
iPhone XS Max – D33
iPhone 11 – N104
iPhone 11 Pro – D42
iPhone 11 Pro Max – D43
iPhone SE (2nd generation) – D79
iPhone 12 mini – D52G
iPhone 12 – D53G
iPhone 12 Pro – D53P
iPhone 12 Pro Max – D54P
iPhone 13 mini – D16
iPhone 13 – D17
iPhone 13 Pro – D63
iPhone 13 Pro Max – D64
iPhone 14 Pro Max – D74
iPhone SE (3rd generation) – D49

iPod

 iPod – Dulcimer
 iPod Classic (5th generation) – M25
 iPod Touch (1st generation) – N45
 iPod Touch (2nd generation) – N72
 iPod Touch (3rd generation) – N18
 iPod Touch (4th generation) – N81
 iPod Touch (5th generation) – N78 and N78a
 iPod Touch (6th generation) – N102

Other
 Brick – Apple's aluminum unibody manufacturing process
 Garta  – An augmented reality device & prototype 
 Luck & Franc  – Apple Glasses, an augmented reality device
 Magnolia – Apple facility including a regenerative thermal oxidizer to reduce pollution
 Titan – Apple Car

Software

Applications
 Apple Fitness+ – Seymour
 AR app – Gobi
 Mac App Store – Firenze
 Apple Music – Fuse
 iMessage – Madrid 
 iTunes – iMusic
 Safari (web browser) – Alexander
 QuickTime – Warhol
 Spotlight –  Matador
 Swift Playgrounds – Serenity
 Walkie-Talkie – Spartan
 Reminders – Tantor

AirPods Firmware
For use with AirPods

 Build 1A6XX - Theremin
 Build 2XXXX -  Harmonica
 Build 3XXXX -  Harpsichord
 Build 4XXXX -  Piccolo

audioOS
For use with HomePod

audioOS 11

audioOS 12

audioOS 13

audioOS 14

audioOS 15

audioOS 15.1

Classic Mac OS
The classic Mac OS is often cited as having multiple codenames.  The codename convention for Mac OS 8 and 9 mostly follow musical terminology.
 System 6.0.4 (1989) – Antares
 System 6.0.5 (1990) – Big Deal
 System 6.0.6 – SixPack (never released due to AppleTalk bug)
 System 6.0.8 (1991) – Terminator
 System 7 – Blue, Big Bang, M80, Pleiades
 System 7.0 (1991) – Furnishings 2000
 System 7.0.1 (1991) – Road Warrior, Beta Cheese
 System 7.1 (1992) – Cube-E, I Tripoli
 System 7.1.1 (aka System 7 Pro) (1993) – Jirocho
 Prototype of System 7.1 for x86 processors – Star Trek
 System 7.5 (PPC) (1994) – Mozart, Capone
 System 7.5.1 – Danook, Thag
 System 7.5.2 – Marconi
 System 7.5.3 – Unity
 System 7.5.3 Revision 2 – Buster
 System 7.5.3 Revision 2.1 – Son of Buster
 System 7.6 – Harmony
 System 7.6.1 – Ides of Buster
 Mac OS 8 – Tempo
 Mac OS 8.1 – Bride of Buster, Scimitar
 Mac OS 8.5 – Allegro 
 Mac OS 8.5.1 – Rick Ford Release, The
 Mac OS 8.6 – Veronica
 Mac OS 9.0 – Sonata
 Mac OS 9.0.4 – Minuet
 Mac OS 9.1 –Fortissimo
 Mac OS 9.2 –Moonlight
 Mac OS 9.2.1 –Limelight
 Mac OS 9.2.2 –LU1

iOS
The codename convention for iOS are ski resorts.

iPhone OS 1

iPhone OS 2

iPhone OS 3

iOS 4

iOS 5

iOS 6

iOS 7

iOS 8

iOS 9

iOS 10

iOS 11

iOS 12

iOS 13/iPadOS 13

iOS 14/iPadOS 14

iOS 15/iPadOS 15

iOS 16

Mac OS X/OS X/macOS 
The internal codenames of Mac OS X 10.0 through 10.2 are big cats.

In Mac OS X 10.2, the internal codename "Jaguar" was used as a public name, and, for subsequent Mac OS X releases, big cat names were used as public names through until OS X 10.8 "Mountain Lion", and wine names were used as internal codenames through until OS X 10.10 "Syrah".

For OS X releases beginning with 10.9, and for macOS releases, landmarks in California were used as public names.

For OS X releases beginning with 10.11, and for macOS releases, varieties of apples were used as internal code names.
 Mac OS X Developer Preview 3 – Bunsen
 Mac OS X Developer Preview 4 – Gonzo
 Mac OS X 10.0 Cheetah Public Beta – Kodiak
 Mac OS X Public Release 1  – Hera
 Mac OS X Public Release 2  – Beaker
 Mac OS X 10.0 – Cheetah, Cyan
 Mac OS X 10.1 – Puma
 Mac OS X 10.3 Panther – Pinot
 Mac OS X 10.4 Tiger – Merlot
 Mac OS X 10.4 Tiger (Support for Intel processors) – Chardonnay
 Mac OS X 10.4.1 Tiger – Atlanta
 Mac OS X 10.5 Leopard – Chablis
 Mac OS X 10.6 Snow Leopard
 Mac OS X 10.7 Lion – Barolo
 OS X 10.8 Mountain Lion – Zinfandel
 OS X 10.9 Mavericks – Cabernet
 OS X 10.10 Yosemite – Syrah
 OS X 10.11 El Capitan – Gala
 macOS Sierra 10.12 – Fuji
 macOS High Sierra 10.13 – Lobo
 macOS Mojave 10.14 – Liberty
 macOS Catalina 10.15 – Jazz
 macOS Big Sur 11 – Golden Gate
 macOS Monterey 12 – Star
 macOS Ventura 13 – Rome

Mac OS X Server
 Mac OS X Server 1.0 – Rhapsody
 Mac OS X Server 10.2 Jaguar – Tigger

tvOS
Version:
 9.0-9.0.1  - MonarchTide
 9.1 - Tilden
 9.1.1 - Noble
 9.2 - Angora
 9.2.1 - Fern
 9.2.2 - Gilmore
 10.0 - Union
 10.0.1 - Bugle
 10.1 - Clementine
 10.1.1 - Diamond
 10.2 - Emerald
 10.2.1 - Florence
 10.2.2 - Gold
 11.0 - Topaz
 11.1 - Bass
 11.2-11.2.1 - Coyote
 11.2.5-11.2.6 - Dixon
 11.3 - Eaton
 11.4 - Francis
 11.4.1 - Grant
 12.0–12.4.1 - Hope
 13.0–13.4.5 - Yager
 14.0–14.7 - Archer
 15.0 - Satellite
 16.0 - Paris

watchOS
watchOS often follows the codename convention for beaches. All betas carry the following codenames, succeeded by the word "Seed". For example, watchOS 3.2 beta is known as ElectricSeed. 
 Apple Watch Electrocardiogram – Cinnamon
 Apple Watch Blood Oxygen – Scandium
 Apple Watch sleep tracking - Burrito –

watchOS 1

watchOS 2

watchOS 3

watchOS 4

watchOS 5

watchOS 6

watchOS 7

watchOS 8

watchOS 9

Technologies
 Switching from PowerPC to x86 architecture and the Intel chip platform – Marklar
 Mac Catalyst – Marzipan
 A system shell for stereo AR-enabled apps – StarBoard
 AppleShare – Killer Rabbit
 CoreMediaIO – Tundra
 Dictation Services – Ironwood
 HFS – Turbo File System (TFS)
 iCloud – Ubiquity
 Toolbox ROM version $077D – SuperMario
 MacInTalk 3.2 Text to Speech (from mis-pronouncing Galatea) – Gala Tea 
 PowerPC Modern Memory Manager PowerPC – Figment
 32-Bit QuickDraw – Jackson Pollock
 QuickDraw GX – Skia
 rOS or realityOS AR Headset operating system – Oak 
 CarPlay – Stark

Services
 Apple Card – Broadway
 Apple Cash – Lexington
 Apple Pay – Stockholm
 Apple Financing & Credit - Breakout
 Retail Store Initiative - Nexus

References 

Codenames

Code names